1933 Your House Is Mine is the second studio album by Missing Foundation, released in 1988 by Purge/Sound League.

Track listing

Personnel 
Adapted from 1933 Your House Is Mine liner notes.

Missing Foundation
Mark Ashwill –drums-metal
Chris Egan – drums
Adam Nodelman;-bass

Florian Langmaack – drums
Peter Missing – guitar-vocals-percussion-drums

Production and additional personnel
Missing Foundation – production
Jim Waters – production

Release history

References

External links 
 

1988 albums
Missing Foundation albums
Restless Records albums